"Grace Note" is the second segment of the twenty-third episode of the first season (1985–86) of the television series The Twilight Zone. In this segment, an opera singer gains a glimpse of her future with a wish from her dying sister.

Plot
It is March 1966. Rosemarie Miletti is taking singing lessons with aspirations of becoming a professional opera singer. However, she struggles to keep up with her studies as she is an oldest child and must care for her family, in particular her sister Mary, who is ill with leukemia. Mary makes Rosemarie promise that when she becomes a big opera star that she won't forget her. Rosemarie denies she'll become an opera star but Mary is insistent. That night, Mary sees a shooting star and makes a wish for Rosemarie.

After grocery shopping, Rosemarie finds the house empty and a note telling her Mary is in the hospital. There, Mary tells Rosemarie to follow the music and she'll see something. Rosemarie heads down the hall, which becomes a different hospital hall as she proceeds. She walks outside and sees a newspaper, which reads March 22, 1986. She hails a cab and asks to go to the Met. The performance, starring herself in La traviata, is sold-out.

After the performance, Rosemarie gets backstage by telling the guard she's Mary Miletti. Rosemarie stands at the dressing room door and listens to her future self talk with her sister Dorothy. Her future self instructs Dorothy to leave the door open when she leaves. As she puts on a pendant with Mary's picture in it she looks back at the open door and remembers herself from not long ago. 1966 Rosemarie hears Mary's voice calling her from the hospital and hurries back to her own time. Mary gives Rosemarie a pendant with her picture in it and says that it was her wish that Rosemarie would become a big opera star. Mary dies and Rosemarie mourns with the rest of the family but knows that her destiny as an opera star awaits.

External links
 
 Postcards from the Zone episode Grace Note

1986 American television episodes
The Twilight Zone (1985 TV series season 1) episodes
Television episodes about time travel
Fiction set in 1966
Fiction set in 1986
Works about opera
Television episodes set in the 1960s
Television episodes set in the 1980s
Television episodes set in hospitals

fr:Chant de grâce